Anjireh may refer to:

 Anjireh-ye Gowkhast, Firuzabad County, Fars Province
 Anjireh, Kavar, Fars Province
 Anjireh, Marvdasht, Fars Province
 Anjireh, Rostam, Fars Province
 Anjireh, Shiraz, Fars Province
 Anjireh, Hamadan
 Anjireh, Hormozgan
 Anjireh, Ilam
 Anjireh-ye Ban Avareh, Kermanshah Province
 Anjireh, Khuzestan
 Anjireh-ye Pain, South Khorasan Province
 Anjireh, Yazd